Sandcastle Waterpark  is an indoor waterpark with 18 water slides and other attractions in Blackpool, Lancashire, England.

Sandcastle Waterpark is also home to slides such as the world's longest indoor roller-coaster water slide, the Master Blaster, and the first vertical indoor drop slide, the Sidewinder.

Family attractions include the Ushi Gushi Action River, the Shimmering Shallows and the Typhoon Lagoon Wavepool.

For younger people there is the Caribbean Storm Treehouse, an interactive adventure play area with a large tipping coconut. There are also a range of water cannons, mini slides and jets within the HMS Thundersplash and Fort Riptide areas.

History
Sandcastle opened on 26 June 1986 on the site of the former South Shore Open Air Baths as a joint public/private partnership. Operation of the facility was taken back into Blackpool Council ownership in 2003. A significant investment in new attractions costing £5.5M was also agreed, which was delivered in two phases, with the second opening in 2006 on time and on budget.

In 2012, Sandcastle opened two new Aztec-themed slides, one with a chamber called 'Aztec Falls', and a toboggan-like slide called 'Montazooma'.

In 2016, Sandcastle Waterpark celebrated its 30th birthday with a monthlong series of events involving a variety of local charities and community groups. On 26 June 2016 as part of these celebrations, the waterpark regained the world record for most riders (529) down a waterslide in one hour. The previous record had stood to a Dutch waterpark at 396 riders.

Slides and attractions 

Key:

Other attractions 
 Swim Shack – Swimwear and accessories shop
 WatersEdge Kitchen/Snack Bar – Food and drink outlet inside the Waterpark
 Waterfalls – Food and drink outlet which is accessible to non-swimmers from the Promenade
 Treetops Trading Post – Souvenirs and branded merchandise

World records
2016: Sandcastle Waterpark sets a new world record on Sunday 26 June 2016 for the most people down a waterslide in one hour when 529 people smash the previous record of 396.
2014: Sandcastle Waterpark took part in the World's Largest Swimming Lesson, helping set the record at 36,564 participants over 22 countries.
2013: Sandcastle Waterpark took part in the Worlds Largest Swimming Lesson. As part of the event Sandcastle Waterpark was recognised as hosting the largest number of participants in the UK. The Guinness World Record was set at 24,873 participants, 432 facilities in 13 countries.
2012: Sandcastle Waterpark was an official host location for The World’s Largest Swimming Lesson, which set a new world record on 11 June 2012 for the largest simultaneous swimming lesson ever conducted.
2008: Ten soldiers set a new world record for the longest distance spent on a water slide. Signaller Mark McCluggage and 9 other soldiers raised over £10,000 for charity by spending 24 hours continually sliding down the Thunderfalls slide.

In popular culture 
 Mr Tumble and Justin Fletcher from CBeebies filmed at Sandcastle Waterpark for the TV series, Something Special in June 2012.
 The Dandy Warhols used footage filmed outside Sandcastle Waterpark in the music video for their single "Autumn Carnival".

References

External links
 Official website

1986 establishments in England
Water parks in the United Kingdom
Tourist attractions in Blackpool
Tourist attractions in Lancashire
Amusement parks in England
Amusement parks opened in 1986